WVIZ (channel 25) is a PBS member television station in Cleveland, Ohio, United States. It is owned by Ideastream Public Media alongside classical music station WCLV, and co-managed with Kent State University–owned WKSU, an NPR member. The three stations share studio facilities at the Idea Center on Playhouse Square in Downtown Cleveland; WVIZ's transmitter is located in suburban Parma, Ohio.

WVIZ also operates a translator, W34FP-D (channel 34), licensed to Eastlake, which serves the far eastern portions of the Cleveland market. Its transmitter is located in Thompson, Ohio.

History
WVIZ was founded by Betty Cope, a former producer at Cleveland's ABC affiliate, WEWS (channel 5), who recognized the value of non-commercial educational television for the schools. After a long struggle to clear all the hurdles, the station signed on the air on February 7, 1965, just in time for the start of the Cleveland school year's second semester. It was the 100th public television station to sign on in the United States. The station's original studios were located in Cleveland's Max Hayes Trade School.

The first voice heard on WVIZ was that of Alan R. Stephenson, Ph.D. As the first director of WVIZ's educational television services department, Stephenson's duties included casting, setting budgets, and acting as executive producer for dozens of local non-commercial educational television productions.

WVIZ was originally a member station of National Educational Television (NET), which was reorganized into PBS in 1970. While some large-market PBS stations established themselves with prime time series, WVIZ remained committed first and foremost to Northeast Ohio's schools, and chose not to engage in national productions for a number of years, although it did produce Truly American, an instructional television program meant for in-school use. It also worked with KETC to produce another instructional television program in about 1972, titled Inside/Out. However, when PBS began transmitting its programs via satellite in 1978, WVIZ hired its first executive producer, Milton Hoffman. He oversaw a few WVIZ productions before resigning in 1982. The next executive producer was Dennis Goulden, formerly of NBC station WKYC-TV (channel 3). Goulden was responsible for the creation of a number of programs and series, such as Kovels on Collecting, Producers Showcase, Mediscene, Dimension and CookSmart. He credits Betty Cope with their creation because, as Goulden stated, she let him experiment. He also gave Larry Elder (now a nationally syndicated radio host) his first show.

The station also aired specials such as a Paul Meincke-hosted special on the tenth anniversary of busing in Cleveland, and an hour-long special on Margaret Bourke-White. Mediscene was a medical series hosted by former nurse M. R. Berger (now deceased). CookSmart was hosted by Susie Heller, and featured guests including Jacques Pepin and Julia Child. Dimension was a monthly series modeled along the lines of CBS' Sunday Morning. Kovels on Collecting was a well-traveled showcase of the wonderfully talented Ralph and Terry Kovel. Goulden worked with the station for approximately four years; WVIZ replaced Goulden quickly in mid-1988 with Mark Rosenberger.

On June 1, 1993, after 28 years at the helm, Betty Cope stepped down as president of WVIZ. Her post went to Jerrold Wareham, the former general manager at Greater Dayton Public Television (operating WPTD in Dayton and WPTO in Oxford). In 1996, WVIZ debuted the program Cleveland Memories. Wareham effectively rid WVIZ of its instructional television programming, filling the daytime hours with PBS Kids series such as Barney & Friends. The station's branding was also modified to "WVIZ/PBS" in January 2000.

In December 2001, WVIZ merged with radio station WCPN to form Ideastream. The new grouping was formed to establish a unified source for public broadcasting and lectures. In early 2006, WVIZ and WCPN moved to a new fully digital studio facility at the Playhouse Square in the Cleveland Theater District; the new facility has an auditorium and studios for dance to music. WVIZ was originally based from studios on Brookpark Road, while WCPN was headquartered out of rented space at Cleveland State University. WVIZ is one of the few PBS member stations to have a new updated digital studio center.

Technical information

Subchannels 
The station's digital signal is multiplexed:

Translators

References

External links

PBS member stations
Television channels and stations established in 1965
1965 establishments in Ohio
VIZ